Transforming acidic coiled-coil-containing protein 2 is a protein that in humans is encoded by the TACC2 gene.

Transforming acidic coiled-coil proteins are a conserved family of centrosome- and microtubule-interacting proteins that are implicated in cancer. This gene encodes a protein that concentrates at centrosomes throughout the cell cycle. This gene lies within a chromosomal region associated with tumorigenesis. Expression of this gene is thought to affect the progression of breast tumors. Expression of this gene is also induced by erythropoietin.

References

Further reading